CCISD may refer to:

Copperas Cove Independent School District
Corpus Christi Independent School District
Clear Creek Independent School District
Corrigan-Camden Independent School District
Crystal City Independent School District